Ameer-ud-Din Medical College (Urdu: امیرالدین طبی کالج) (abbreviated as AMC; also known as PGMI Medical College), established in 2011, is one of the six public colleges of medicine located in, Lahore, Punjab, Pakistan. Lahore General Hospital is attached as a training and teaching hospital. The college is named after Amiruddin, a surgeon and teacher.

It is established on the initiative of CM Shehbaz Sharif to give quality education in the region of Punjab and especially in Lahore. It is registered with PMDC, listed in IMED, affiliated with PGMI and UHS, and approved by the Ministry of Health.

History
Ameer-ud-Din Medical College (abbreviated as AMC; also known as PGMI Medical College), established in 2012, is one of the five public colleges of medicine located in, Lahore. It is registered with PMDC, listed in IMED, affiliated with PGMI and UHS, and approved by the Ministry of Health. Lahore General Hospital is attached as a training and teaching hospital. Dr. Ameer served as senior professor of surgery at Mayo Hospital at the time of partition. He rendered glorious services for the treatment of those who got injured at the hands of Sikhs and Hindus during migration. The secret of his success as a medical educationist lay in the fact that he practiced in his life what he preached in his lectures to his students. Prof. Ameer-ud-Din was punctual and produced health professionals who headed various eminent institutions in Punjab and other provinces. He used to extend his helping hands towards the needy impecunious patients and educational scholarships to deserving students. Prof. Ameer sold his personal capacious house situated in the most expensive area of the city Gulberg and donated all the money got from purchasing his house to the development of the Paediatric Surgery Ward of Mayo Hospital Lahore. Considering his unprecedented contribution towards a medical education and his arduous services for ailing humanity, the Academic Council of PGMI/AMC decided to honor him by giving his name to this newly established medical college. The fifth badge of 100 students is inducted every year. University of Health Sciences (UHS) processes the Admission procedure. The first batch of Ameer-ud-Din Medical College bagged first position in the Punjab Province which is a tribute to Dr. Ameer in some way. May his soul rest in eternal peace.

Departments

Basic science departments
Anatomy
Biochemistry
Community medicine
Forensic medicine
Pathology
Pharmacology
Physiology

Medicine and allied departments
Cardiology
Dermatology
Endocrinology & Metabolism
General medicine
Neurology
Pediatrics
Preventive medicine
Psychiatry
Pulmonology (Chest medicine)
Radiotherapy
Urology

Surgery and allied departments
Anesthesiology
Cardiac surgery
Cosmetic surgery
General surgery
Neurosurgery
Obstetrics and gynaecology
Ophthalmology
Oral and maxillofacial surgery
Orthopedics
Otorhinolaryngology
Pediatric surgery
Radiology

Administrative departments
IT Department

Achievements 
In 2015, AMC has shown excellent results by scoring 99% result. In 2016, AMC scored 100% passing score for First Professional Part 1 examination. In 2018, AMC stood first among 39 medical colleges in third year MBBS examination.

References

External links
 
 IMED Profile

Medical colleges in Punjab, Pakistan
Universities and colleges in Lahore